Mike Feniger is a retired American soccer player.

In 1993, Feniger graduated from Cumberland Valley High School.  He attended East Stroudsburg University of Pennsylvania where he was a 1994, 1995 and 1996 First Team Division II All American soccer player. He holds the team's career records in goals (76) and assists (37).  In 2010, East Stroudsburg inducted Feniger into the school's athletic hall of fame.

In December 1996, the Philadelphia KiXX picked Feniger in the first round (second overall) of the National Professional Soccer League draft.  On February 1, 1997, the Colorado Rapids selected him in the third round (twenty-first overall) of the 1997 MLS College Draft.  Four days later, the Hershey Wildcats picked him in the first round of the USISL A-League draft.  The Rapids released him during the pre-season and Feniger signed with the Wildcats.  He played five seasons with the Wildcats until the team folded following the 2001 season.  On October 19, 2001, he signed with the Harrisburg Heat of the second Major Indoor Soccer League.  On December 23, 2003, he became one of the three players to sign with the expansion Harrisburg City Islanders.

References

External links
 City Islanders: Mike Feniger

1975 births
Living people
American soccer players
East Stroudsburg Warriors men's soccer players
Penn FC players
Harrisburg Heat players
Hershey Wildcats players
Major Indoor Soccer League (2001–2008) players
Reading United A.C. players
A-League (1995–2004) players
USL Second Division players
Colorado Rapids draft picks
People from Mechanicsburg, Pennsylvania
Association football forwards
Association football midfielders